Highland Heights is a city in Cuyahoga County, Ohio, United States. Originally part of Mayfield Township, Highland Heights is part of the Greater Cleveland area. As of the 2010 census the city's population was 8,345.

Geography
Highland Heights is located at  (41.551051, -81.471273).

Demographics

91.1% spoke English, 3.9% Italian, 1.8% Chinese, 1.2% Russian, and 0.8% spoke German at home, 0.02% Urdu.

2010 census
As of the census of 2010, there were 8,345 people, 3,205 households, and 2,481 families living in the city. The racial makeup of the city was 91.0% White, 1.9% African American, 0.1% Native American, 5.8% Asian, 0.3% from other races, and 0.9% from two or more races. Hispanic or Latino of any race were 1.4% of the population.

Of the city's population over the age of 25, 50.9% held a bachelor's degree or higher.

There were 3,205 households, of which 31.0% had children under the age of 18 living with them, 67.6% were married couples living together, 7.1% had a female householder with no husband present, 2.7% had a male householder with no wife present, and 22.6% were non-families. 20.5% of all households were made up of individuals, and 11.6% had someone living alone who was 65 years of age or older. The average household size was 2.60 and the average family size was 3.01.

The median age in the city was 48.2 years. 21.8% of residents were under the age of 18; 6.2% were between the ages of 18 and 24; 16.9% were from 25 to 44; 35% were from 45 to 64; and 20% were 65 years of age or older. The gender makeup of the city was 49.2% male and 50.8% female.

2000 census
As of the census of 2000, there were 8,082 people, 2,779 households, and 2,309 families living in the city. The population density was 1,575.0 people per square mile (608.3/km2). There were 2,862 housing units at an average density of 557.8 per square mile (215.4/km2). The racial makeup of the city was 93.18% White, 1.39% African American, 0.01% Native American, 4.60% Asian, 0.06% from other races, and 0.75% from two or more races. Hispanic or Latino of any race were 0.45% of the population.

There were 2,779 households, out of which 36.6% had children under the age of 18 living with them, 74.5% were married couples living together, 6.6% had a female householder with no husband present, and 16.9% were non-families. 15.7% of all households were made up of individuals, and 9.2% had someone living alone who was 65 years of age or older. The average household size was 2.89 and the average family size was 3.24.

In the city the population was spread out, with 26.8% under the age of 18, 6.1% from 18 to 24, 22.3% from 25 to 44, 27.2% from 45 to 64, and 17.6% who were 65 years of age or older. The median age was 42 years. For every 100 females, there were 95.5 males. For every 100 females age 18 and over, there were 92.0 males.

The median income for a household in the city was $69,750, and the median income for a family was $78,922. Males had a median income of $56,250 versus $33,277 for females. The per capita income for the city was $31,184. About 3.1% of families and 4.0% of the population were below the poverty line, including 3.8% of those under age 18 and 3.1% of those age 65 or over.

Schools

Highland Heights is a part of the Mayfield City School District, along with Mayfield Heights, Mayfield Village, and Gates Mills.

Highland Heights is home to Mayfield's largest elementary school, Millridge Elementary, and CEVEC (Cuyahoga East Vocational Education Consortium). The local Catholic parish, St. Paschal-Baylon, also runs a preschool-8th grade school.

Notable facts
 Highland Heights used to be home to the Front Row Theater, which operated between 1974 and 1993. In 1988, musician Roy Orbison played his last show there, two days prior to his death.
 Highland Heights was the first city in Cuyahoga County to require new residential neighborhoods to have underground wiring and ornamental lamp posts.
 Highland Heights is home to the Stonewater Golf Club, where several tournaments of the Nationwide Tour were held.
 In 2011, the city was rated the 30th Best Place to Live (in the United States) by Money magazine.

Surrounding communities

References

External links
 City of Highland Heights

Cities in Ohio
Cities in Cuyahoga County, Ohio
1920 establishments in Ohio